Jared Pellerin (born May 29, 1992), known professionally as Pell, is an American rapper, singer, songwriter, and producer. After moving from New Orleans, LA to Jackson, MS due to Hurricane Katrina, Pell began performing music. His track, "Eleven:11", was remixed by G-Eazy and released to the public on May 20, 2015 under the new title, "Got It Like That (Eleven:11 Remix)". The track gained over 7 million plays on Spotify. Pell released his first full-length LP, LIMBO, on November 6, 2015, in partnership with Dave Sitek's label, Federal Prism.

Musical career

Following Hurricane Katrina, Pell moved from New Orleans to Jackson, MS with his mother. While sharing his grandmother's 2-bedroom home with 10 of his family members, Pell found his beat machine to be a way to make friends and connect with people in his new environment. It was the confidence he built from tinkering with his beat machine, and learning about music from his brother, former NFL player Micah Pellerin, that led him to begin rapping and performing alongside his friends at St. Joseph Catholic School (Madison, Mississippi). He continued his musical pursuits throughout high school and into his days as a student at Mississippi State University, where he connected with Jacob Reed, his current manager.

After deciding to put his studies on hold and pursue music full-time, Pell released his first project, Floating While Dreaming, on May 20, 2014 which "earned praise as one of the top independent releases of the year". The project premiered via Complex (magazine) and has gained over 11 million streams as of February 2016.

Pell's first full-length project was LIMBO, which dropped on November 6, 2015. This gave him the platform to do his first headlining tour.

He continued his musical run by releasing the "girasoul" EP in partnership with Payday Records on December 8, 2017. The title plays off the Spanish word for "sunflower" and showcased Pell's knack for experimentation with sound to create a soulful experience.

Discography

Projects

Singles

Tours

References

External links
 Official website
 

1992 births
American hip hop DJs
Living people